Auspicious Winds is the third studio album by Yume Bitsu, released on November 14, 2000 by K Records.

Track listing

Personnel 
Adapted from the Auspicious Winds liner notes.

Yume Bitsu
Jason Anderson – drums
Alex Bundy – keyboards
Adam Forkner – vocals, guitar
Franz Prichard – guitar, design

Production and design
Rick Duncan – recording
Mark Greer – mastering
Joe Guest – photography
Calvin Johnson – recording, photography

Release history

References

External links 
 

2000 albums
K Records albums
Yume Bitsu albums